The 1999–00 Argentine Primera B Nacional was the 14th season of second division professional of football in Argentina. 34 teams competed; the champion and runner-up were promoted to Argentine Primera División.

Club information

Interior Zone

Metropolitana Zone

Interior Zone Standings

Metropolitana Zone Standings

Promotion Playoff
The Promotion Playoff was played by the teams placed 1st and 2nd of each zone. The winning team was declared champion and was automatically promoted to Primera División. The teams that lost in semifinal joined into the Quarterfinals of the Second Promotion Playoff, and the team that lost in the final joined in the semifinal of the Second Promotion Playoff.

Semifinals

|-
!colspan="5"|Semifinals

|-
!colspan="5"|Semifinals

1: Qualified because of sport advantage.

Final

|-
!colspan="5"|Final

Second Promotion Playoff
The Second Promotion Playoff or Torneo Reducido was played by the teams placed 3rd to 6th of each zone. Atlético de Rafaela and San Martín (M) joined in the Quarterfinals, and Quilmes joined in the Semifinals. The winner was promoted to Primera División.

Bracket

1: Qualified because of sport advantage.
Note: The team in the first line plays at home the second leg.

Promotion Playoff Primera División-Primera B Nacional
The best two teams of the overall standings that were not promoted (Quilmes and Almagro)  played against the 18th and the 17th placed of the Relegation Table of 1999–2000 Primera División.

|-
!colspan="5"|Relegation/promotion playoff 1

|-
!colspan="5"|Relegation/promotion playoff 2

|-
|}

 Almagro was promoted to 2000–01 Primera División by winning the playoff and Instituto was relegated to the 2000–01 Primera B Nacional.
Belgrano remains in Primera División after a 4-4 aggregate tie by virtue of a "sports advantage". In case of a tie in goals, the team from the Primera División gets to stay in it.

Relegation
Note: Clubs with indirect affiliation with AFA are relegated to the Torneo Argentino A, while clubs directly affiliated face relegation to Primera B Metropolitana. Clubs with direct affiliation are all from Greater Buenos Aires, with the exception of Newell's, Rosario Central, Central Córdoba and Argentino de Rosario, all from Rosario, and Unión and Colón from Santa Fe.

Interior Zone

Metropolitana Zone

See also
1999–2000 in Argentine football

References

External links

Primera B Nacional seasons
Prim
1999 in South American football leagues
2000 in South American football leagues